Jan Látal (born March 21, 1990) is a Czech professional ice hockey defenceman. He played with HC Karlovy Vary in the Czech Extraliga during the 2010–11 Czech Extraliga season.

References

External links

1990 births
Czech ice hockey defencemen
HC Karlovy Vary players
Living people
JKH GKS Jastrzębie players
Orlik Opole players
Stjernen Hockey players
HC Berounští Medvědi players
HC Most players
HC Nové Zámky players
Rytíři Kladno players
Czech expatriate ice hockey players in Germany
Czech expatriate ice hockey players in Slovakia
Plymouth Whalers players
Czech expatriate sportspeople in Norway
Czech expatriate sportspeople in Poland
Czech expatriate ice hockey players in the United States
Expatriate ice hockey players in Poland
Expatriate ice hockey players in Norway
People from Prague-West District
Sportspeople from the Central Bohemian Region